The Niasse, along with the Kumpo and the Samay, are three traditional masked figures in the religion of the Jola people, living in the Casamance (Senegal) and in Gambia.

They play a central role in the social life of the traditional village. Multiple times in the course of the year, e.g. during the Journées culturelles, a folk festival in the village is organized.

All three figures are masked dancers. The kumpo is completely covered with palm leaves and is considered to be a ghost. Between the niasse and the samay, which are more people-like, there are fewer differences. The type of dance is a bit different; other differences are:

Casamance
Gambian dancers
Jola religion
Senegalese dancers